Ayaka Noguchi (born 25 October 1995) is a Japanese professional footballer who plays as a midfielder for WE League club Omiya Ardija Ventus.

Club career 
Noguchi made her WE League debut on 12 September 2021.

References 

WE League players
Living people
1995 births
Japanese women's footballers
Women's association football midfielders
Association football people from Saitama Prefecture
Omiya Ardija Ventus players
Japanese expatriate sportspeople in Spain
Primera División (women) players
Japanese expatriate women's footballers
Expatriate women's footballers in Spain
Segunda Federación (women) players
Primera Federación (women) players
CP Cacereño (women) players